The Florida Open is the Florida state open golf tournament, open to both amateur and professional golfers. It is now organized by the Florida State Golf Association (FSGA). It has been played annually since 1942 at a variety of courses around the state. There were earlier "Florida Open"s played in the 1920s and 1930s, not associated with the current version, that are considered official PGA Tour events.

Winners

2022 Andy Pope
2021 Connor Arendell
2020 J. C. Deacon
2019 Sean Dale
2018 Gabriel Lench (amateur) 
2017 J. C. Deacon
2016 Caleb Johnson, Jr.
2015 John Jonas (amateur)
2014 Caleb Johnson, Jr.
2013 Tyler McCumber
2012 Chase Seiffert (amateur)
2011 Rod Perry
2010 Ben Vertz (amateur)
2009 Thomas Murray (amateur)
2008 No tournament
2007 Travis Hampshire
2006 Camilo Benedetti
2005 Colby Beckstrom
2004 No tournament due to Hurricanes Frances and Jeanne
2003 Joe Alfieri
2002 No tournament
2001 Duke Donahue
1999–2000 No tournament
1998 Jimmy Stobs
1997 Jay Townsend
1996 Eric Brito
1995 Rodney Butcher
1994 Bart Bryant
1993 Jim Chancey
1992 Ronnie McCann
1991 Joey Rassett
1990 Dudley Hart
1989 Jim Ragland
1988 Bart Bryant
1987 Bruce Fleisher
1986 Mitch Adcock
1985 John Huston
1984 Ron Terry
1983 Larry Mowry
1982 Donnie Hammond
1981 Richard Blake
1980 Bruce Fleisher
1979 Larry Mowry
1978 Tony Valentine
1977 Rich Bassett
1976 Jim King
1975 Lee Wykle
1974 Charles Owens
1973 Billy Maxwell
1972 Ted Kroll
1971 Jim King
1970 Eddie Pearce (amateur)
1969 Gary Koch (amateur)
1968 Joe Lopez
1967 Bob Murphy
1966 Pete Cooper
1965 Tom Malone
1964 Howell Fraser
1963 J. C. Goosie
1962 Don Bisplinghoff (amateur)
1961 Don Bisplinghoff (amateur)
1960 Dub Pagan
1959 Howell Fraser (amateur)
1958 Pete Cooper
1957 Pete Cooper
1956 Dave Ragan (amateur)
1955 Don Bisplinghoff (amateur)
1954 Jim McCoy (amateur)
1953 Burl Bolesta
1952 Gardner Dickinson
1951 Lloyd Wadkins
1950 Pete Cooper
1949 Pete Cooper
1948 Pete Cooper
1947 Charles Harper
1946 Pete Cooper
1945 Burl Bolesta
1944 Pete Cooper
1943 Willie Turnesa (amateur)
1942 Lou Broward (amateur)

Previous tournaments under the same name

1931 Wiffy Cox and Joe Turnesa (tie)
1929 Horton Smith
1928 Henry Ciuci
1927 Billy Burke
1926 Johnny Farrell
1925 Leo Diegel
1922 George Kerrigan
1921 Jim Barnes
1911 Gilbert Nicholls
1906 Walter Travis

External links
Florida State Golf Association
List of winners

Former PGA Tour events
Golf in Florida
State Open golf tournaments
Recurring sporting events established in 1912
1912 establishments in Florida